Akazawa (written: 赤沢) is a Japanese surname. Notable people with the surname include:

, Japanese ice hockey player
, Japanese politician

See also
Akagawa

Japanese-language surnames